The Dawada (Duwwud, Dawwada) is an Afro-Arab ethnic group from the Fezzan region of southern Libya. They live around the Gabraoun oasis, at the town of Murzuk, where they harvest brine shrimp in the salty lakes. They dry the brine shrimp and sell them to caravans. The name Dawada means "worm-folk" in Arabic due to this practice. The appearance of the Dawada is distinctive and has been linked to a relict population. They are mostly an endogamic group which rarely marry outside of their tribe. They speak an Arabic dialect.

References

Ethnic groups in Libya